Ghassan Jaoudat Ismail is the head of the Syrian Air Force Intelligence unit.  

Ismail was in command of the missions branch of the air force intelligence service, which, in cooperation with the special operations branch commands the elite shock troops of the air force intelligence service.

The Air Force Intelligence plays an important role in the operations conducted by the Assad government during the Syrian Civil War. As such, Ismail is one of the military leaders directly implementing the order of battle against opponents of Bashar al-Assad.

On 8 July 2019, he was appointed head of the Air Force Intelligence unit.

References

1960 births
Living people
Syrian generals
People from Tartus Governorate
Syrian Alawites